Flavius Eusebius was a bureaucrat of the Eastern Roman Empire. He was magister officiorum (492-497) under the rule of Anastasius I, and appointed twice consul for Constantinople: once in 489 with Petronius Probinus as his Western counterpart; and again in 493 with Albinus as his counterpart.

The fact he was appointed consul twice suggests he was somehow related to the Emperor Anastasius.

References

5th-century Romans
5th-century Roman consuls
Imperial Roman consuls
Date of birth unknown
Date of death unknown